Lycée Franco-Nicaraguayen Victor Hugo (LVH) is a French international school in eastern Managua, Nicaragua. It serves levels maternelle (preschool) through lycée (senior high school).

The school opened in 1971.

As of March 2015 there are 43 maternelle students, 93 primary school students, and 142 secondary school students, making a total of 278 students in all levels. During the year 2019–2020, due to a bad management, all the teachers didn't get their salary

See also

References

External links
  Lycée Franco-Nicaraguayen Victor Hugo
  Lycée Franco-Nicaraguayen Victor Hugo
  "Découvrez le lycée Français de Managua !" Embassy of France in Nicaragua.

Managua
International schools in Nicaragua
Schools in Managua